esyN (Easy Networks) is a bioinformatics web-tool for visualizing, building and analysing  molecular interaction networks. esyN is based on cytoscape.js and its aim is to make it easy for everybody to perform network analysis. 
esyN is connected with a number of databases - specifically: pombase, flybase, and most InterMine data warehouses, DrugBank, and BioGRID from which its possible to download the protein protein or genetic interactions for any protein or gene in a number of different organisms.

Networks published in esyN can be easily published in other websites using the <iframe> methodology.

Usage 
As of January 2016 esyN is being viewed by 1500 unique users a day (about 16000 a month) according to Google Analytics.

The embedding capabilities of esyN are used by a number of databases to display their interaction data:
 FlyBase
 FlyMine
 HumanMine
 PomBase

See also 
 Computational genomics
 Metabolic network modelling
 Protein–protein interaction prediction

References

External links 
 

Bioinformatics software
Metabolomic databases
Proteomics
Science and technology in Cambridgeshire
South Cambridgeshire District